Barry Michael Egan (1879 – 3 March 1954) was an Irish politician and businessman. He was first elected to Dáil Éireann as a Cumann na nGaedheal Teachta Dála (TD) for the Cork Borough constituency at the June 1927 general election. He was re-elected at the September 1927 general election but he did not contest the 1932 general election. He stood again at the 1933 general election but lost his seat.

Egan was managing director of the family firm of silversmiths, William Egan & Sons. His Cork shop was burned out by the Black and Tans during the War of Independence. From July to September 1922, when Cork was a closed city, Egan was responsible for producing Cork republican silver, for which he devised his own hallmark.

References

1879 births
1954 deaths
Cumann na nGaedheal TDs
Members of the 5th Dáil
Members of the 6th Dáil
Politicians from County Cork